Perry B. Clark (born September 30, 1957) is an American politician who served as a member of the Kentucky Senate for the 37th district from 2006 to 2021.  Clark also served in the Kentucky House of Representatives from 1995 to 2006, resigning to run for the Kentucky Senate special election in the 37th District.

He has been a member of several committees, including the Task Force on Economic Development and the Administrative Regulation Review Subcommittee.

References

Living people
1955 births
Democratic Party Kentucky state senators
Politicians from Louisville, Kentucky
21st-century American politicians